Thomas W. Freeman (1824 – October 24, 1865) was a prominent Confederate politician. He was born in Anderson County, Kentucky and later moved to Missouri. he represented the state in the First Confederate Congress from 1862 to 1864.

External links
 Political Graveyard biography

1824 births
1865 deaths
Members of the Confederate House of Representatives from Missouri
19th-century American politicians
People from Anderson County, Kentucky